eXpat Party was a syndicated radio programme featuring the big party songs of the past 50 years. Hosted by Mabbs & Justice, it was a two-hour programme from the same producers as The eXpat Chart. It is produced by Fourway Media on a weekly basis.

The programme has a website which features the latest on the programme.

Features 
The Last Dance
A slow number that is requested by the listeners that wraps the programme up.

The Golden Year
A time tunnel format feature, which features the big party songs from a year in question.

Broadcast stations 

The eXpat Chart is broadcast to over 40 radio stations across the globe. All times are local to the location of broadcast. Some of the stations include:

Ace FM in Alhaurin & Coin in mainland Spain - 106.8fm and online  
Coast FM in Tenerife - 89.2 & 100.8fm and online 
UK Away FM in Lanzarote - 99.4 & 99.9fm and online 
88.6 Island FM in Zante - 88.6fm and online 
Energy FM in Malta - 96.4fm and online

See also 
2011 in radio

References 

Radio stations established in 2011